The Siberian Republic (Russian: Сибирская Республика, Sibirskay Respublika) (July 17, 1918 – November 3, 1918) was a unrecognized short-living state that existed on the territory of Russia during the Civil War.

Background 
The appearance of the Siberian Republic was the result of many years of struggle by Siberian regionalists for the sovereignty of the region. The ideology of the Siberian Republic was Siberian regionalism (supporters, who occupied the majority of ministerial posts in the government of the new state)

History of the Republic 
Executive power belonged to the Provisional Siberian Government, which was located in Omsk, legislative power belonged to the Siberian Regional Duma. The basis of the armed forces was the Siberian Army, which consisted of several tens of thousands of people.

On July 4, 1918, in Omsk, the Provisional Siberian Government, headed by Pyotr Vologodsky, adopted the "Declaration of Independence of Siberia", canceled on November 3, 1918.

Inside the Siberian Republic, there was a struggle between the liberal wing (Provisional Siberian Government) and the socialist wing of regionalism (Siberian Regional Duma), which ended in the fall of 1918 with the dissolution of the Siberian Regional Duma. The consequences of the conflict were the crisis of Siberian statehood, the collapse of the Cabinet of Ministers, the weakening of civilian and strengthening military power, in a series of uprisings. The liberal movement of the oblasts entered into an alliance with the all-Russian political forces and sacrificed the idea of Siberian separatism in order to consolidate the white forces for an attack on Moscow.

The Siberian Republic was self-liquidated after the formation of the white Russian state and the Provisional All-Russian Government on September 23, 1918, got control over Siberia in accordance with the declaration of November 3, 1918.

Leadership

Head of state

Heads of government

References

Literature 

 , 1921. — Том 1, Том 2.;  Москва: Айрис-Пресс, 2008. — ISBN 978-5-8112-3010-5.
 
 
  — § 4.1. Образование сибирской государственности и её ликвидация.
  — РГБ ОД, 71:04-7/61.
  
 
 
 

History of Siberia
1918 in Russia
White movement
Post–Russian Empire states
Russian anti-communists